Kingmatille  is a smock mill in Dronryp, Friesland, Netherlands which was moved to its present location in 1985. The mill is listed as a Rijksmonument, number 28614.

History

Kingmatille was originally built in 1870 to drain the  Van Duinen Polder. It was replaced by a diesel engine. The mill was restored in 1950 and in 1985 it was moved to its present location, by the Hatzumer Polder. The mill was officially opened on 23 October 1991 by Pieter van Vollenhoven. In May 1987, the Archimedes' screw broke. It was repaired by spring 2009.

Description

Kingmatille is a three-storey smock mill on a single-storey base. There is no stage, the sail reaching almost to the ground. The smock and cap thatched. The mill is winded by tailpole and winch. The sails are Common sails. The sails are carried on a cast-iron windshaft. The windshaft also carries the brake wheel which has 38 cogs. This drives the wallower (20 cogs) at  the top of the upright shaft. At the bottom of the upright shaft, the crown wheel, which has 29 cogs drives a gearwheel with 30 cogs on the axle of the wooden Archimedes' screw. The screw is inclined at 22°. Each revolution of the screw lifts  of water.

Public access
Kingmatille is open to the public by appointment on Tuesdays and Thursdays.

References

Windmills in Friesland
Windmills completed in 1985
Smock mills in the Netherlands
Windpumps in the Netherlands
Rijksmonuments in Friesland
Octagonal buildings in the Netherlands
Waadhoeke